"Q" is a single released in 1990/1991 by Mental Cube (better known as Future Sound of London). It is a widely respected dance classic among DJs and has a distinctive bleeping, electronica feel reminiscent of work by Orbital.

Track listings

1990 release
 Q (Original) (4:10)
 Q (Santa Monica Mix) (4:10)

1991 release
 Q (Remix) (4:51)
 Q (Santa Monica Mix) (4:12)
 Q (Original Mix) (4:15)

Crew
Artwork By One Way
Artwork By [Sleeve Computer Graphic] Frédérick Avrado
Producer - FSOL, Yage
Written By - B. Dougans, G. Cobain

References

External links
 

1990 songs
1991 singles
The Future Sound of London songs